A spile is a small wooden or metal peg used to control the flow of air into, and carbon dioxide out of, a cask of ale. Spiles can also be used to broach water from trees.

Ale use
Cask ale is dispensed without the addition of externally supplied gas. That it is served "flat" with no bubbles at all is, however, a misconception. Properly conditioned cask ale will have enough dissolved carbon dioxide to produce bubbles of carbon dioxide. This has been generated by the natural action of the yeast living in the beer while it is stored and transported. In fact, the yeast can produce more carbon dioxide than is required, and it is for this reason that the cask is vented through the hole in the shive.

When it is first delivered to the place where beer will be poured from it or where it will be connected to the beer engine, the cask is sealed. It has a keystone (where the tap will be driven in) and a shive (through which it was filled). Once it has been laid down in the location at which the beer is going to be dispensed, a venting punch is used to pierce the shive, which is either partially pre-drilled or has a hardwood tutt sealing the completely drilled hole. This breaks the seal, and the tap can then be driven into the keystone – if it is hammered in when there is still a high internal pressure, it can be blown out again, with embarrassing consequences.

To allow the loss of excess gas, soft spiles, made of open-grained softwood, bamboo, or harder wood with cuts in, are used. Once the cellarman judges this process to be complete, a hard spile is inserted which does not allow any more gas out. These are made of harder wood (usually still technically "softwood", but denser and more solid than soft spiles). When beer is being drawn from the cask this is removed and can be replaced by a soft spile, or left open. When no beer is being dispensed a hard spile is put back in. Plastic spiles are also available..

Once the spile is reinserted, enough gas will be generated by the yeast to replace the volume of gas that will have come out of solution. But the amount of carbon dioxide that can be produced is limited, so a hard spile is kept in as much as possible. This is one of the reasons for real ale's short shelf-life once a cask is opened – if too much carbon dioxide is lost, the beer will become flat. Typically, the beer will be good only for two to four days; this short shelf life is why it is important that a pub serving real ale have sufficient turnover for casks to be emptied while still at their best.

Other uses for spiles 
Like many such older terms, the word spile has other local meanings. For example:
 Tapper, an implement used to tap any sort of tree (e.g., for birch sap, maple syrup, rubber tapping, or palm wine from a toddy palm).
 The iron or wood spigot driven into a sugar maple to produce maple syrup.
 At Indian Harbour in Nova Scotia, the shores on which fish processing "stores" were located were called spiles.
 A Spile is also a term used in boatbuilding to describe the means/actions which a builder uses to determine the shape of any curved piece needing to be fitted to a curved surface.
 A wooden stake or fence post.

In popular culture
A spile is utilized to obtain water in the novel Catching Fire (2009) and subsequent film The Hunger Games: Catching Fire (2013).

The spile consists of a tube with one end sharpened and the other split. When pounded into a tree, a stream of fresh water flows from the tube. Most of the year, this is not consistent with the nature of trees, as water diffuses upward through very tiny capillary passages. When a tree is cut down, water does not flow out of the cut surface. The technique used in the movie would only work in early spring or late winter, when the watery sap runs high in the trees.

The taps that are placed in maple trees are placed into drilled holes and the resultant fluid is sap, not water.

See also
 Keystone
 Spigot

Notes

References

Bibliography

External links

Brewing
Tree tapping